Criccieth Castle is a native Welsh castle situated on the headland between two beaches in Criccieth, Gwynedd, in North Wales, on a rocky peninsula overlooking Tremadog Bay. It was built by Llywelyn the Great of the kingdom of Gwynedd, but was heavily modified following its capture by English forces of Edward I in the late 13th century.

Construction

The stone castle had first been built in the 1230s, there were three main building phases plus several periods of remodelling.  The earliest part of the masonry castle is the inner ward which was started by Llywelyn the Great. Unlike most other Welsh native strongholds, the inner ward at Criccieth was protected by a gatehouse with twin D-shaped towers that was protected by a gate and portcullis, with murder holes in the passage, and outward facing arrowslits in each tower. Archaeologist Laurence Keen suggested that Criccieth's gatehouse was based on the design of those at Beeston Castle in Cheshire, which was built for Ranulf de Blondeville in the 1220s, as they have similar plans. This design is also similar to Montgomery Castle, Powys. The two towers of the gatehouse at Criccieth provided accommodation and their height was later increased in the Edwardian period.  The castle's well was also in the gatehouse passage which was supplied by a spring fed cistern.

In the 1260s or 1270s, an outer ward was added during the second building phase under Llywelyn ap Gruffudd.  A new gateway was added in the outer curtain with a large two-storey rectangular tower.  The castle, although not a proper concentric design, now had two circuits of circular defences.

Criccieth was taken by English forces in 1283. Under James of Saint George, another two storey rectangular tower connected to the rest of the castle by a curtain wall, the "Engine Tower" (now in ruins) might have been the foundation for a siege engine. The gatehouse had another storey added and several Welsh mural towers were strengthened. An outer barbican was added to the outer curtain wall.

Under Welsh stewardship, the principal residence was in the SW tower but when the castle was taken over by the English, accommodation was situated in the D-shaped towers of the gatehouse. Timber buildings, which included a great hall, were erected within the inner ward.

History

A motte and bailey stood at a different site in Criccieth before the masonry castle was built. In 1239, Llywelyn the Great imprisoned Gruffudd ap Llywelyn ap Iorwerth and Owain Goch, respectively his son and grandson, at Criccieth; this was likely at the castle.

In 1283 the castle was captured by English under the command of Edward I. It was then remodelled by James of St George.

In 1294, Madoc ap Llywelyn, a distant relation of Llywelyn ap Gruffudd, began an uprising against English rule that spread quickly through Wales.  Several English-held towns were razed and Criccieth (along with Harlech Castle and Aberystwyth Castle) were besieged that winter. Its residents survived until spring when the castle was resupplied.

In the 14th century the castle had a notable Welsh constable called Hywel ap Gruffydd, known as Howell the Axe, who fought for Edward III at the Battle of Poitiers in 1356.

The castle was used as a prison until 1404 when Welsh forces captured the castle during the rebellion of Owain Glyndŵr. The Welsh then tore down its walls and set the castle alight. Some stonework still shows the scorch marks. Around that time it was noted that "Crukkith Castle had Roger de Accon for Constable, with six men-at-arms and fifty archers; annual maintenance £416, 14s, 2d."

Criccieth was also one of several locations Romantic artist Joseph Mallord William Turner used for his famous series of paintings depicting shipwrecked mariners.

Present day
The castle is maintained by Cadw. It includes exhibits and information on Welsh castles as well as the 12th-century Anglo-Norman writer Gerald of Wales.

Constable of the castle
The official roles of the Constable were - Governor of the castle, governor of the fortified borough, keeper of the castle gaol (prison), Mayor and extraordinary duties.

During 1283 the castle was recorded to have a garrison of : 30 men, 10 cross-bowmen, 1 superintendent at arms, 1 Chaplain, 1 Stone mason, 1 Carpenter, 1 Artisan, 15 residents, William De Leyburn was the constable with a yearly fee of £100.

List of constables
Information regarding the former constables of the castle:

Gallery

See also
 Castles in Great Britain and Ireland
 List of castles in Wales

References

Bibliography
 
 -

External links

Cadw visitor's page 
www.geograph.co.uk : photos of Criccieth castle

Criccieth
Castles in Gwynedd
Castles of Llywelyn the Great
Prisons in Gwynedd
Gwynedd
Castle ruins in Wales
Cadw
Grade I listed castles in Wales
Grade I listed buildings in Gwynedd